The James Bowie Award Ribbon is an award within the awards and decorations of the Texas State Guard Nonprofit Association that may be presented to a member of the Texas Military Forces, within the United States Armed Forces.

Eligibility
The James Bowie Award Ribbon may be awarded to members of the Texas State Guard.

Use
The James Bowie Award Ribbon is awarded by the Texas State Guard Nonprofit Association for meritorious achievement and service in furthering the aims of the Texas Military Forces, the State, or the Texas State Guard component of the Texas State Guard Nonprofit Association. The nominee has demonstrated humanitarianism through the individual's generosity of time and self and whose distinguished service was conducted with the highest military standard of leadership, organizational ability, and skills for the betterment of others. The actions of the nominee must include 3 years of service to Texas Military Forces or the Association. The nominee must also be a current member or associate member of the Texas State Guard Nonprofit Association or must be a current or former member of the Military Forces of the State of Texas. Second and additional receipt of this award is indicated by a silver star. There is not a separate medal awarded with the ribbon.

References

Awards and decorations of the Texas Military Forces
Ribbon symbolism